Spookfish may refer to:

 Barreleye, a family of fish
 Brownsnout spookfish Dolichopteryx longipes, a fish species that uses mirrors in its eyes, the only known animal to have this function.
 Javelin spookfish Bathylychnops exilis
 several species of Chimaera